Alexander Clay (27 September 1863 – 9 November 1950) was a Scotland international rugby union player.

Rugby Union career

Amateur career
Clay played rugby union for Edinburgh Academicals.

Provincial career
He played for the East of Scotland District in January 1887

He was capped by Edinburgh District to play in the inter-city match of 1887

International career
He played 7 matches for Scotland from 1886 to 1888.

References

1863 births
1950 deaths
Rugby union players from Kelso
Scottish rugby union players
Scotland international rugby union players
Edinburgh Academicals rugby union players
East of Scotland District players
Edinburgh District (rugby union) players
Rugby union forwards